The 1946 Western Kentucky State Teachers Hilltoppers football team represented Western Kentucky State Teachers College (now known as Western Kentucky University) as a member of the Kentucky Intercollegiate Athletic Conference (KIAC) during the 1946 college football season. Led by Jesse Thomas, who returned for his second season as head coach after helming the team in 1933, the Hilltoppers compiled an overall record of 2–6 with a mark of 1–3 in conference play. The team's captains were Dallas Arnold and Rapheal "Boots" Able.

Schedule

References

Western Kentucky State Teachers
Western Kentucky Hilltoppers football seasons
Western Kentucky State Teachers Hilltoppers football